Zehra Borazancı (born September 16, 1989) is a Turkish-Cypriot women's football midfielder currently playing in the Turkish Women's Super League for ALG Spor with jersey number 22. She is also a successful international football tennis player for her country.

Personal life 
Zehra Borazancı was born in Famagusta, Northern Cyprus, on September 16, 1989.

Football career 

Borazancı began playing football at a very young age. She  played in her country Northern Cyprus for the Kyrenia-based sports club Akdeniz Spor Birliği  in the Women's League organized by the Cyprus Turkish Football Association (KTFF) between 2008 and 2012. She enjoyed her team's champion title in four seasons in a row, and became top scorer with 14 goals in 2010.

In 2012, she played for Girne American University at the 
Northern Cyprus Inter-University Women's Football and Futsal Championship, and enjoyed her team's champion title.

She moved to Turkey, and obtained her Turkish license from Akdeniz Nurçelk Spor on December 2, 2011. She played the 2011–12 season in the Turkish Women's Second League for Istanbul Nurçelik Spor. The next season, she was transferred by Adana İdmanyurduspor, which played in the Women's First League. After one season, Borazancı went to the Netherlands, and signed with AGE Rotterdam playing in the Durch Women's Second League. At the end of the season, she returned to her former club Adana Idmanyurduspor, where she played two full seasons. In the second half of the 2016–17 season, she moved to the Izmir-based successful club Konak Belediyespor. She enjoyed her first Turkish Keague champion title with Konak Belediyespor, which became the fifth time champion in a row.

Borazancı made her international debut with Konak Belediyespor in the 2017–18 UEFA Women's Champions League qualifying round – Group 1 match against WFC Martve in Tbilisi, Georgia on August 22, 2017. She took part in three matches of the tournament.

Borzancı signed with the Istanbul-based club Ataşehir Belediyespor before the club's participation at the 2018–19 UEFA Women's Champions League qualifying round. She played in two of the three matches of the qualification round.

In October 2018, she joined the Gaziantep-based club ALG Spor, which were promoted to the Women's First Leagıe in the 2018–19 season. By October 2019, she transferred to Kireçburnu Spor in Istanbul. After playing 8 games and scoring three goals in the first half of the 2019-20 First League season, she moved to 1207 Antalyaspor to play in the Second League.

Borazancı transferred to the Ankara-based Fomget Gençlik ve Spor  in the 2020-21 Turkcell Women's Football League.

In June 2021, she joined her former club ALG Spor to play in the Turkish Women's Super League. She enjoyed the 2021-22 Women's Super League champion title of her team. On 18 August 2022, she playedin the 2022–23 UEFA Women's Champions League.

Football tennis career 
Borzancı took part at the 11th World Footballtennis Championship 2014 held in North Nicosia representing her country Northern Cyprus, and became runners-up in the Women's single event. In 2015, she became silver medalist with her teammate  Gizem Yahat in the Women's double event at the European Football Tennis Championship in Târgoviște, Romania. As part of the Northern Cyprus women's national football team, she participated at the 2016 FIFTA World Football Tennis Cup held in Northern Cyprus, she placed the third rank in the Women's double event with her teammate Ayşe Mullacuma. In 2017, Borazancı was a member of her country's team at the 2017 European Football Tennis Championship held in Bucharest, Romania.

Career statistics 
.

Honours 
Turkish Women's First League
 Konak Belediyespor
 Winners (1): 2016–17
 ALG Spor
 Runners-up (1): 2018–19,  2021-22

References

External links 

Living people
1989 births
People from Famagusta
Turkish Cypriot women's footballers
Women's association football midfielders
Turkish Cypriot expatriates in the Netherlands
Expatriate women's footballers in Turkey
Turkish Cypriot expatriate sportspeople in Turkey
Expatriate sportspeople in the Netherlands
Akdeniz Nurçelik Spor players
Adana İdmanyurduspor players
Konak Belediyespor players
Ataşehir Belediyespor players
ALG Spor players
Kireçburnu Spor players
1207 Antalya Spor players
Fomget Gençlik ve Spor players
Turkish Women's Football Super League players
Turkish Cypriot expatriate sportspeople